This is a listing of the horses that finished in either first, second, or third place and the number of starters in the Maryland Million Lassie, an American state-bred stakes race for two-year-old fillies at seven furlong on the dirt held at Laurel Park Racecourse in Laurel, Maryland.  (List 1986-present)

See also 

 Maryland Million Lassie
 Maryland Million Day
 Laurel Park Racecourse

References

 Maryland Thoroughbred official website

Horse races in Maryland
Recurring events established in 1986
Laurel Park Racecourse
Recurring sporting events established in 1986
1986 establishments in Maryland